Mannenbach-Salenstein railway station is a railway station in Salenstein, in the Swiss canton of Thurgau. It is an intermediate stop on the Lake line and is served by local trains only.

Services 
Mannenbach-Salenstein is served by the S1 of the St. Gallen S-Bahn:

 : half-hourly service between Schaffhausen and Wil via St. Gallen.

References

External links 
 
 

Railway stations in the canton of Thurgau
Swiss Federal Railways stations